Veselin Jevrosimovic is the owner and chairman of IT company Comtrade, headquartered in Belgrade. He is also the president of the Athletics Association of Serbia.  Serbia

Background
Veselin Jevrosimović was born in Serbia, Belgrade in 1965, he grew up in a middle class working Serbian family, in a big Belgrade municipality and neighbourhood of Voždovac, has an older brother Veljko and a cousin  Marija who lives in Amsterdam, in the Netherlands. He earned a place in the national athletics team and later became the national University league pole vault champion. As part of the Düsseldorf Athletics Club he spent some time in Germany, later in the United States. Mr Jevrosimović would later advance his education with an IT engineering degree from the Information Technology School in Belgrade.

Career
In 1986 Mr Jevrosimovic became the co-owner of an IT equipment distribution company in Germany. Keeping his connections in the U.S., he started a computer distribution business there, which led to him becoming a partner in CHS Electronics later in the 90s. Parallel to businesses in Germany and the U.S. he founded Comtrade Group in Serbia in 1991, a company that would later become one of the largest IT organizations in Southeast Europe. In 1996, CHS Electronics, at which Mr. Jevrosimović was a partner, had become the no.2 computer equipment distribution company in the world with an annual turnover of 12.5 billion dollars. Later that year Veselin sold his shares at the company and returned to Serbia to focus on development of Comtrade’s business.

Favouring a regional expansion strategy, Mr. Jevrosimović opened a company in Bosnia and Herzegovina in 1997 and proceeded to expand the network into Montenegro, Macedonia, Croatia and Albania. In 2008 he led the acquisition of the largest Slovenian software company, Hermes Softlab. This purchase was a confirmation of Comtrade’s evolution to software engineering and development, which began in 2000 when Jevrosimović founded Spinnaker, a system integration company that later changed its name into Comtrade System Integration. The software segment is now the largest within the Comtrade Group and contributes to over 80 per cent of its annual income. In 2004 he bought property in New Belgrade that he transformed into the Comtrade Technology Center (2006) - the first IT campus of its kind to house and foster the activity of IT experts in the region.

The Comtrade Group currently has more than 4,000 employees, a large percentage of whom are software engineers.

Awards and distinctions
Veselin Jevrosimović is a member of the World Economic Forum and actively participates in forum meetings. He has also received the prestigious Top Manager of Southeastern Europe Award, Most Innovative Investor in Southeastern Europe Award and the IT Industry Legend Award in Monte Carlo. In 2008, Mr Jevrosimović became the first Serbian to be recognized as an honorary citizen of Boston for his company’s contribution to the city’s economy.

References

Serbian technology writers
Computer programmers
Businesspeople from Belgrade
Living people
Year of birth missing (living people)